Ray O'Rourke (born 11 January 1948) is a former  Australian rules footballer who played with Geelong in the Victorian Football League (VFL).

Notes

External links 

Living people
1948 births
Australian rules footballers from Tasmania
Geelong Football Club players
Hobart Football Club players
Hobart Football Club coaches